Harm Lagaay (born Harm Lagaaij, 28 December 1946, The Hague) is a Dutch automobile designer. Educated in the Netherlands he completed the studies at the IVA and went to work for a Dutch company Olyslager in Soest.

In the late 1960s, Lagaay went to work for Simca, then from 1971 for Porsche. He worked in the team designing the Porsche 911 and designed the Porsche 924. From 1977, Lagaay worked as Chief of Design for Ford in Cologne, and moved to BMW in 1985.

Lagaay designed the BMW Z1 sports car, with electric doors hiding under the car's chassis and easily exchangeable body panels. This car was too advanced for its times and did not have commercial success, as only 8000 were sold. Today, the BMW Z1 is a collector's item.

He returned to Porsche in 1989 as head of the "Style Porsche" department in Weissach. As well as the Porsches of the period – the Porsche 968, Porsche 993 (also the 989, the stillborn four door Porsche) (the 1993-1997 generation of the 911 for which Englishman Tony Hatter is also credited), Boxster, Cayenne, 996 (the all-new 911 of 1997), Carrera GT – he also oversaw the company's work for external clients.

He retired from Porsche in July 2004 and has been followed by Michael Mauer of Germany.

See also
 Adrian van Hooydonk
 Tony Hatter

References

External links
 OnlyPorsche.net: Porsche names new Design Chief; veteran Harm Lagaay to retire
 BMW Designers  An overview of automotive designers working for BMW.

1946 births
Living people
Dutch automobile designers
Delft University of Technology alumni
Engineers from The Hague